Ernő Garami (born as Ernő Grünbaum, 13 December 1876 – 28 May 1935) was a Hungarian mechanic who became a social democratic politician and editor, who served as Minister of Justice in 1919.

References
 Magyar Életrajzi Lexikon

1876 births
1935 deaths
Justice ministers of Hungary
Mechanics (people)